Cho Gang-min (born 4 June 1996) is a South Korean taekwondo practitioner. He won the gold medal in the men's 63 kg event at the 2018 Asian Taekwondo Championships held in Ho Chi Minh City, Vietnam. In the same year, he also won one of the bronze medals in the men's 63 kg event at the 2018 Asian Games held in Jakarta, Indonesia.

In 2013, he won the gold medal in the boys' 62 kg event at the 2013 Asian Youth Games held in Nanjing, China. At the 2014 Asian Taekwondo Championships held in Tashkent, Uzbekistan, he won one of the bronze medals in the men's −58kg event. In 2015, he competed in the men's flyweight event at the 2015 World Taekwondo Championships held in Chelyabinsk, Russia. He was eliminated in his second match by Lucas Guzmán of Argentina.

References

External links 
 

Living people
1996 births
Place of birth missing (living people)
South Korean male taekwondo practitioners
Taekwondo practitioners at the 2018 Asian Games
Medalists at the 2018 Asian Games
Asian Games bronze medalists for South Korea
Asian Games medalists in taekwondo
Asian Taekwondo Championships medalists
21st-century South Korean people